"Do G's Get to Go to Heaven" is the second single from Richie Rich's third studio album Seasoned Veteran. The single was released February 11, 1997 on Def Jam Recordings and features backing vocals by Bo-Roc and Ephriam Galloway. It peaked at number 10 on the Billboard Rap Songs, at number 57 on the Billboard Hot 100, and at number 73 on the Billboard Hot R&B/Hip-Hop Songs. The song is dedicated to the memory of Tupac Shakur.

Along with the single, a music video was produced to promote the album.

Track listing
 "Do G's Get to Go to Heaven?" (Radio Edit)
 "Do G's Get to Go to Heaven?" (LP Version)
 "Do G's Get to Go to Heaven?" (Instrumental)

Chart history

References

1997 singles
1996 songs
American hip hop songs
Gangsta rap songs
Def Jam Recordings singles